The Amphitheater and Fieldstone WPA Features at Valley City Pioneer Park in Barnes County, North Dakota is listed on the National Register of Historic Places.

The features were built by the Works Progress Administration (WPA) in 1937 and include four fieldstone cairns at the entrance to Pioneer Park and "PIONEER" spelled out with stones

References

Park buildings and structures on the National Register of Historic Places in North Dakota
National Register of Historic Places in Barnes County, North Dakota
Works Progress Administration in North Dakota
Amphitheaters on the National Register of Historic Places
1937 establishments in North Dakota
Stone buildings in the United States